The Nong Xun mine is a large mine in the southern part of Laos in Khammouane Province. Nong Xun is one of the largest tin reserves in Laos, having estimated reserves of 29.4 million tonnes of ore grading 0.16% tin.

References 

 

Tin mines in Laos